Joseph Leo Mankiewicz (February 11, 1909 – February 5, 1993) was an American film director, screenwriter, and producer. Mankiewicz had a long Hollywood career, and won both the Academy Award for Best Director and the Academy Award for Best Adapted Screenplay in consecutive years for A Letter to Three Wives (1949) and All About Eve (1950), the latter of which was nominated for 14 Academy Awards and won six.

Comfortable in a variety of genres and able to elicit career performances from actors and actresses alike, Mankiewicz combined ironic, sophisticated scripts with a precise, sometimes stylized mise en scène.

Mankiewicz worked for seventeen years as a screenwriter for Paramount Pictures and as a writer and producer for Metro-Goldwyn-Mayer before getting a chance to direct at 20th Century Fox. Over six years, he made 11 films for Fox.

During his over 40-year career in Hollywood, Mankiewicz wrote 48 screenplays. He also produced more than 20 films, including The Philadelphia Story (1940) which was nominated for the Academy Award for Best Picture, and Woman of the Year (1942), for which he introduced Katharine Hepburn to Spencer Tracy.

Early life
Mankiewicz was born in Wilkes-Barre, Pennsylvania, to Franz Mankiewicz (died 1941) and Johanna Blumenau, Jewish emigrants from Germany and Courland, respectively. Besides his older sister, Erna Mankiewicz Stenbuck (1901–1979), he had an older brother, Herman J. Mankiewicz (1897–1953), who brought him to Hollywood to become a screenwriter. Herman also won an Oscar for co-writing Citizen Kane (1941).

At age four, Mankiewicz moved with his family to New York City, graduating in 1924 from Stuyvesant High School. He followed his brother to Columbia University, where he majored in English and wrote for the Columbia Daily Spectator, and after he graduated in 1928, he moved to Berlin, where he worked at several jobs, including translating film intertitles from German to English for UFA.

Hollywood career

Paramount
In 1929 Mankiewicz got a contract to work as a writer at Paramount, through his brother Herman. Herman was one of the writers on The Dummy (1929), on which Mankiewicz wrote titles. He also did titles for Close Harmony (1929) and The Man I Love (1929) with Jack Oakie, The Studio Murder Mystery (1929), Thunderbolt (1929), The River of Romance (1929), The Saturday Night Kid (1929) with Clara Bow, The Mysterious Dr. Fu Manchu (1929), and The Virginian (1929) with Gary Cooper.

Mankiewicz started to be credited on screenplays for films like Fast Company (1929) starring Jack Oakie and Slightly Scarlet (1930) and he worked on the script for The Light of Western Stars (1930) with Richard Arlen and Paramount on Parade (1930). Mankiewicz wrote The Social Lion (1930) with Oakie, Only Saps Work (1930), The Gang Buster (1931) with Arlen, Finn and Hattie (1931) with Oakie, and June Moon (1931) with Oakie.

He also did the scripts for Skippy (1931) with Jackie Cooper, Dude Ranch (1931) with Oakie, Newly Rich (1931), and Sooky (1931), a sequel to Skippy. This was followed by This Reckless Age (1932), Sky Bride (1932) with Arlen and Oakie, Million Dollar Legs (1932) with Oakie and W.C. Fields, Night After Night (1932) (uncredited), and If I Had a Million  (1932). He was borrowed by RKO for Diplomaniacs (1933) and Emergency Call (1933). He returned to Paramount for Too Much Harmony (1933) with Oakie and Bing Crosby, Meet the Baron (1933) (uncredited), and the all-star Alice in Wonderland (1933).

MGM
Mankiewicz signed a long-term contract with MGM. He wrote Manhattan Melodrama (1934), which was a huge hit. He freelanced for King Vidor to work on Our Daily Bread (1934). At MGM he wrote Forsaking All Others (1934) with Clark Gable, Joan Crawford and Robert Montgomery as well as After Office Hours (1935) with Gable and Constance Bennett, Reckless (1935) with Jean Harlow and William Powell, Broadway Melody of 1936 (1935), and I Live My Life (1935) with Crawford.

Mankiewicz was promoted to producer with Three Godfathers (1936). On most of his films as producer he would work uncredited on the script. Mankiewicz had a commercial and critical success with Fury (1936), the first American film directed by Fritz Lang. Mankiewicz produced a series of films starring Crawford: The Gorgeous Hussy (1936), Love on the Run (1936), The Bride Wore Red (1937), and Mannequin (1937).

Mankewicz also produced Double Wedding (1937) with William Powell and Myrna Loy; Three Comrades (1938), with Margaret Sullavan and Robert Taylor and director Frank Borzage, famously rewriting F. Scott Fitzgerald; The Shopworn Angel (1938) with Margaret Sullavan and James Stewart;  and The Shining Hour (1938) with Sullavan and Crawford, directed by Borzage. He also did some uncredited writing on The Great Waltz (1938), and the script which became The Pirate (1948).

He produced A Christmas Carol (1938); The Adventures of Huckleberry Finn (1939) with Mickey Rooney; and Strange Cargo (1940) with Gable and Crawford, directed by Borzage. He had a huge hit with The Philadelphia Story (1940) starring Katharine Hepburn, Cary Grant and James Stewart. It was followed by The Wild Man of Borneo (1941), and The Feminine Touch (1941), then he had another big success with Hepburn, Woman of the Year (1942). Mankiewicz's final productions at MGM were Cairo (1942) with Jeanette MacDonald and Reunion in France (1942) with Crawford and John Wayne.

20th Century Fox
Mankiewicz received an offer at 20th Century Fox that included the right to direct. His first film for the studio was The Keys of the Kingdom (1944), which he wrote with Nunnally Johnson and produced. It co-starred his wife Rose Stradner.

Mankiewicz made his directorial debut with Dragonwyck (1946), which he also wrote; Gene Tierney and Vincent Price starred. He followed it with Somewhere in the Night (1946), a film noir which he co-wrote. He worked as director only on The Late George Apley (1947) with Ronald Colman, The Ghost and Mrs. Muir (1948) with Tierney and Rex Harrison, and Escape (1948) with Harrison. All were based on scripts by Philip Dunne.

Mankiewicz had a huge success with A Letter to Three Wives (1949), which he wrote and directed, winning Oscars for both; Sol Siegel produced. He and Siegel collaborated again on House of Strangers (1949), on which Mankiewicz did some uncredited writing. Mankewicz wrote and directed No Way Out (1950), which launched the career of Sidney Poitier; Darryl F. Zanuck was credited as producer. Zanuck also took that credit on Mankiewicz's next film, All About Eve (1950), which quickly became regarded as a classic.

Mankewicz adapted and directed People Will Talk (1951), also produced by Zanuck, which starred Cary Grant and Jeanne Crain. He did some uncredited work on the script for I'll Never Forget You (1952).  His last film under contract with Fox was 5 Fingers (1952), starring James Mason and Danielle Darrieux.

Independent
In 1951 Mankiewicz left Fox and moved to New York, intending to write for the Broadway stage. Although this dream never materialized, he continued to make films (both for his own production company Figaro and as a director-for-hire) that explored his favorite themes – the clash of aristocrat with commoner, life as performance and the clash between people's urge to control their fate and the contingencies of real life.

In 1953 he adapted and directed Julius Caesar for MGM, an adaptation of Shakespeare's play produced by John Houseman. It received widely favorable reviews, and David Shipman, in The Story of Cinema, described it as a "film of quiet excellence, faltering only in the later moments when budget restrictions hampered the handling of the battle sequences". The film serves as the only record of Marlon Brando in a Shakespearean role; he played Mark Antony and received an Oscar nomination for his performance.

Figaro
In 1953, Mankiewicz set up his own production company, Figaro. Its first production was The Barefoot Contessa (1954) which Mankiewicz wrote, produced and directed; it starred Humphrey Bogart and Ava Gardner. Sam Goldwyn hired him to write and direct the film version of the musical Guys and Dolls (1955). This was a huge hit but not highly regarded critically. Brando starred along with Frank Sinatra and Jean Simmons.

In 1958 Mankiewicz wrote and directed The Quiet American for Figaro, an adaptation of Graham Greene's 1955 novel about American military involvement in what would become the Vietnam War. Mankiewicz, influenced by the climate of anti-Communism and the Hollywood blacklist, switched the message of Greene's book, changing major parts of the story. A cautionary tale about America's blind support for "anti-Communists" was turned into, according to Greene, a "propaganda film for America".

That year Figaro produced I Want to Live! (1958) though Mankiewicz had relatively little to do with it. He directed Suddenly, Last Summer (1959) for producer Sam Spiegel, from a script by Gore Vidal and a play by Tennessee Williams. Elizabeth Taylor, Hepburn and Montgomery Clift starred. It was a hit at the box office but attracted mixed reviews.

Cleopatra
In 1961, 20th Century Fox was producing Cleopatra starring Elizabeth Taylor and hired Mankiewicz to replace director Reuben Mamoulian. Mankiewicz accepted a lucrative contract, which he came to regret. The film consumed two years of his life and ended up both derailing his career and adding to severe financial losses for the studio, Twentieth Century-Fox.

Later career
Mankiewicz produced and directed Carol for Another Christmas (1964) for television. He wrote and directed The Honey Pot (1967) for United Artists and Charles K. Feldman, and produced and directed There Was a Crooked Man... (1970), as well as doing some uncredited work on the documentary King: A Filmed Record... Montgomery to Memphis (1970). Mankiewicz garnered an Oscar nomination for Best Direction in 1972 for Sleuth, his final directing effort, starring Laurence Olivier and Michael Caine, who also received Oscar nominations.

In 1983, he was a member of the jury at the 33rd Berlin International Film Festival.

Family history
Mankiewicz was the younger brother of legendary Hollywood screenwriter Herman J. Mankiewicz, co-writer (with Orson Welles) of Citizen Kane among numerous other films. 

His sons are Eric Reynal (from his first marriage, to actress Elizabeth Young), producer Christopher Mankiewicz, and writer/director Tom Mankiewicz.  He also has a daughter, Alex Mankiewicz. 

He was the uncle of Frank Mankiewicz, a well-known political campaign manager who officially announced the assassination of presidential candidate Robert F. Kennedy in 1968, and the late Johanna Mankiewicz Davis, a writer who was struck and killed by a taxicab in New York City at the age of 36. 

His great-nephews include writer-filmmaker Nick Davis (Johanna's son), NBC Dateline reporter Josh Mankiewicz and television personality Ben Mankiewicz (Frank's sons).

Death
Mankiewicz died of a heart attack on February 5, 1993, six days before his 84th birthday. He was interred in Saint Matthew's Episcopal Churchyard cemetery in Bedford, New York.

Filmography

Director

Writer

Fast Company (1929) co-writer
Slightly Scarlet (1930) co-writer
Paramount on Parade (1930)
The Social Lion (1931) adaptation
Only Saps Work (1931) co-writer
The Gang Buster (1931)
Finn and Hattie (1931)
June Moon (1931) co-writer
Skippy (1931) co-writer
Newly Rich (1931) co-writer
Sooky (1931) co-writer
This Reckless Age (1932) co-writer
Sky Bride (1932) co-writer
Million Dollar Legs (1932) story
If I Had A Million (1932) (segments "China Shop", "Three Marines", "Violet") uncredited
Diplomaniacs (1933) co-writer
Emergency Call (1933) co-writer
Too Much Harmony (1933) story
Alice in Wonderland (1933) co-writer
Manhattan Melodrama (1934) co-writer
Our Daily Bread (1934) dialogue
Forsaking All Others (1934)
I Live My Life (1935)
Woman of the Year (1942)
The Keys of the Kingdom (1944) co-writer
Dragonwyck (1946)
Somewhere in the Night (1946) co-writer
A Letter to Three Wives (1949)
House of Strangers (1949) uncredited
No Way Out (1950) co-writer
All About Eve (1950)
People Will Talk (1951)
Julius Caesar (1953) uncredited
The Barefoot Contessa (1954)
Guys and Dolls (1955)
The Quiet American (1958)
Cleopatra (1963) co-writer
The Honey Pot (1967)

Awards

Directed Academy Award performances

See also

Herman Mankiewicz
Ben Mankiewicz

References
Notes

Further reading
 Chrissochoidis, Ilias (ed.) (2013) The Cleopatra Files: Selected Documents from the Spyros P. Skouras Archive. Stanford.
 Dick, Bernard F. (1983) Joseph L. Mankiewicz. New York, Twayne Publishers. 
 
 
 
 Lower, Cheryl Bray (2001) Joseph L. Mankiewicz: Critical Essays and Guide to Resources. Jefferson, NC, McFarland & Co. 
 Oderman, Stuart (2009) Talking to the Piano Player 2. BearManor Media. .
 Mankiewicz, Tom and Crane, Robert (2015)My Life as a Mankiewicz: An Insider's Journey through Hollywood. Lexington, Kentucky: University Press of Kentucky. 
Stern, Sydney Ladensohn (2019) The Brothers Mankiewicz: Hope, Heartbreak, and Hollywood Classics. Jackson, Mississippi: University Press of Mississippi.

External links

 
 
 Senses of Cinema: Great Directors Critical Database
 
 Joseph L. Mankiewicz papers, Margaret Herrick Library, Academy of Motion Picture Arts and Sciences

1909 births
1993 deaths
American male screenwriters
Best Adapted Screenplay Academy Award winners
Best Directing Academy Award winners
Columbia College (New York) alumni
Presidents of the Directors Guild of America
Film producers from New York (state)
German-language film directors
American people of German-Jewish descent
Jewish American writers
Mankiewicz family
People from the Scranton–Wilkes-Barre metropolitan area
People from Bedford, New York
Stuyvesant High School alumni
Writers Guild of America Award winners
Film directors from Pennsylvania
20th Century Studios people
Directors Guild of America Award winners
20th-century American businesspeople
Activists from New York (state)
Film directors from New York City
Screenwriters from New York (state)
20th-century American male writers
20th-century American screenwriters
Burials in New York (state)